Franck Abrial (born 18 March 1964) is a French wrestler. He competed in the 1988 Summer Olympics.

References

External links
 

1964 births
Living people
Wrestlers at the 1988 Summer Olympics
French male sport wrestlers
Olympic wrestlers of France
Sportspeople from Lyon
20th-century French people